, better known by his ring name , also written Danshoku Dieno, is a Japanese professional wrestler. Dino has spent most of his career competing for DDT Pro-Wrestling (DDT), where he plays an overly exaggerated homosexual character. His ring name comes from the Japanese name for the character Baron Dino from the manga series Sakigake!! Otokojuku.

Early life
In elementary, junior and high school, Dino played soccer alongside Keita Kanemoto who was his team captain.

Professional wrestling career
Dino was trained in shoot fighting prior to training to be a wrestler and he incorporated this training into his wrestling style.

In addition to wrestling in DDT Pro-Wrestling (DDT), he has also competed in several independent wrestling promotions around Japan, including Dragon Gate, Ice Ribbon, Kaientai Dojo, Osaka Pro Wrestling and Pro Wrestling Zero1-Max. In February 2007, Dino made his first excursion overseas, as he debuted for a few American independent promotions such as Chikara, Combat Zone Wrestling (CZW) and International Wrestling Cartel (IWC).

On April 4, 2019, at DDT Is Coming to America, Dino and Antonio Honda were defeated by Joey Ryan and Royce Issacs. Later on, he defeated Saki Akai to become the 1,354th Ironman Heavymetalweight Championship for the 23rd time.

Joey Ryan credits Dino with coming up with the sequence for the YouPorn Plex.

Championships and accomplishments

DDT Pro-Wrestling
DDT Extreme Championship (8 times)
DJ Nira World and All Time High Championship (1 time)
DJ Nira World and History's Strongest Championship (1 time)
GAY World Anal Championship (2 times)
Greater China Unified Sichuan Openweight Championship (1 time)
IMGP World Heavyweight Championship (1 time)
Ironman Heavymetalweight Championship (32 times)
JET World Jet Championship (1 time)
KO-D 10-Man Tag Team Championship (1 time) – with Asuka, Yuki Iino, Mizuki and Trans-Am★Hiroshi 	
KO-D 6-Man Tag Team Championship (5 times, current) – with Kensuke Sasaki and Makoto Oishi (1), Aja Kong and Makoto Oishi (1), Ken Ohka and Super Sasadango Machine (1), Kenso and Super Sasadango Machine (1), and Yuki "Sexy" Iino and Yumehito "Fantastic" Imanari (1)
KO-D Openweight Championship (4 times)
KO-D Tag Team Championship (3 times) – with Glenn "Q" Spectre (1), Kota Ibushi (1) and Yoshihiro Takayama (1)
Umemura PC Juku Copy & Paste Championship (1 time)
UWA World Trios Championship (1 time) – with Hikaru Sato and Masa Takanashi
World Midbreath Championship (1 time)
World Ōmori Championship (1 time)
DDT48 / Dramatic Sousenkyo (2010, 2013, 2017)
Japan Indie Awards
Best Unit Award (2015) – with Ken Ohka and Super Sasadango Machine
Best Unit Award (2021) – with Yuki "Sexy" Iino and Yumehito "Fantastic" Himanari

References

External links

Official DDT Pro-Wrestling site in Japanese

Official website (Japanese)

Japanese male professional wrestlers
LGBT characters in professional wrestling
Living people
1977 births
People from Hiroshima Prefecture
People from Onomichi, Hiroshima
Sportspeople from Hiroshima Prefecture
21st-century professional wrestlers
UWA World Trios Champions
DDT Extreme Champions
Ironman Heavymetalweight Champions
KO-D 8-Man/10-Man Tag Team Champions
KO-D Tag Team Champions
KO-D Openweight Champions